Tun Thura Thet is a Burmese technology specialist and technopreneur who was the Vice-Chairman of the Myanmar Computer Federation (MCF) from 2018 to 2021.

Education 
 Practising School Yangon Institute of Education- 1987
 Curtin University of Technology, Perth, Australia - 1995, BCom Information Systems
 Nanyang Technological University, Singapore - 2006, MSc (Information Studies)
 Nanyang Technological University, Singapore - 2009, PhD

Career
He established MIT in 1997 and is considered one of the pioneers in that then-nascent field of information technology in Myanmar. Nowadays, MIT provides ICT services in banking sector, retail sector, hospitality sector, healthcare sector and in digital innovation technology-related services in Myanmar and Singapore.

References

External links 
ACM Digital Library
This Month Myanmar Insider took  a Peek at One Of Yangon’s Businessman. Myanmar Insider
Decades-old bets in Myanmar's tech industry finally reap rewards
Govt draft roadmap to develop and support digital economy in Myanmar The Myanmar Times
Dr.Tun Thura Thet of  Myanmar Information Technology Pte ltd Today myanmar
CONVOCATION CEREMONY SPEAKER 2015 – DR TUN THURA THET
https://dl.acm.org/citation.cfm?id=1411817

Burmese economists
Living people
Place of birth missing (living people)
1972 births